Joris De Loore and Frederik Nielsen were the defending champions but chose not to defend their title.

Scott Clayton and Adil Shamasdin won the title after defeating Matt Reid and John-Patrick Smith 7–5, 3–6, [10–5] in the final.

Seeds

Draw

References

External links
 Main draw

Challenger Banque Nationale de Drummondville - Doubles
2019 Doubles